Akiachak Airport  is a state-owned public-use airport located in Akiachak, in the Bethel Census Area of the U.S. state of Alaska.

As per Federal Aviation Administration records, this airport had 2,607 passenger boardings (enplanements) in calendar year 2007, an increase of 44% from the 1,811 enplanements in 2006.

Facilities 
Akiachak Airport has one runway designated 1/19 with a 3,300 by 60 ft (1,004 x 18 m) gravel surface. For the 12-month period ending August 26, 2005, the airport had 3,000 aircraft operations, an average of 250 per month, all of which were air taxi.

The state has plans to acquire  to relocate the airport and build a new  runway.

Airlines and destinations

Prior to its bankruptcy and cessation of all operations, Ravn Alaska served the airport from multiple locations.

Statistics

References

External links 
 Airport diagram from FAA, Alaskan Region (GIF)

Airports in the Bethel Census Area, Alaska